Grete Albrecht (17 August 1893 – 5 August 1987) was a German neurologist. After World War II ended in 1945 and women doctors were no longer banned from having contracts with the national health insurance system if their husbands were wage earners, Albrecht helped to reestablish the Hamburg Medical Board and served as a director on the board until 1963.

Early life and education
When she was just 12 years old, Albrecht decided she wanted to become a doctor; however, her father prohibited her from studying medicine. After he died when she was 15, she began attending an all-girls private high school. But because the high school lacked equipment and resources, Albrecht and other female students had to walk to the boys' school to use labs to study hard sciences such as chemistry and physics, which were only made available to them for one hour each day.

Career
Albrecht went on to study medicine at Munich and Freiburg before attending the University of Kiel in 1914. Here, she started working in a lab and attending classes at the University Surgical Center in August 1914, right as World War I was beginning. One year later, in 1915, Albrecht passed the Physikum and started clinicals. In 1918 she received her medical license and took the place of a physician who had been stationed at the front lines of the ongoing war.

After getting married and having two children, Albrecht had to leave her practice in Berlin and moved to Hamburg, where she began volunteering in the internal medicine and dermatology wards at a local hospital. It was in Hamburg that her interest in mental and neurological diseases began.

In 1928 Albrecht started training at the University Clinic in Marburg and the University Clinic in Eppendorf. She started practising as a neurologist in 1931. When the Nazi period began, however, Albrecht was forbidden to have a contract with the national health insurance system because her husband also had a job.

When the Second World War ended in 1945, Albrecht helped in reestablishing the Hamburg Medical Board and became a director, a title she held until 1963. She also helped establish the German Medical Women's Association and was vice president of the Medical Women's International Association from 1958 to 1963.

References

1893 births
1987 deaths
German neurologists
University of Kiel alumni
Place of birth missing
Place of death missing
German women physicians